A deflectin is one of a family of antibiotic chemicals produced by Aspergillus deflectus which contain a 6H-furo[2,3-h]-2-benzopyran-6,8(6aH)-dione core.

Deflectins are yellow coloured crystalline substances when pure. They react with ammonia, by replacing an oxygen atom in the six-membered ring with an NH group. They are weak acids. On adding a strong base to an alcoholic solution of deflectin, it show a red colour for a short time.
Deflectin 1a contains a 1-oxooctyl side chain. It has a melting point of 161 °C. Deflectin 1b contains a ten carbon side chain and melts at 152 °C. Deflectin 1c has a 12-atom side chain and melts at 141 °C.

Deflectin 2a melts at 122 °C. It has a 10 carbon atom side chain with a 2-methyl branch. Deflectin 2b is similar but the side chain is 2 atoms longer. It melts at 111 °C.

Chemical structures

References

Antibiotics